The Kniebrink, at , is the third highest mountain in the northern German Wiehen Hills. Its immediate summit belongs administratively to the village of Oberbauerschaft in the municipality of Hüllhorst. However, its boundary with the town of Lübbecke runs just north of the summit, so that its northern slopes belong to Lübbecke.

The Kniebrink is just 3 metres lower than the more northerly Wurzelbrink, which obscures it from view in Lübbecke. The hill is largely trackless. In spring 2007 its trees suffered major storm damage. The top can be reaches from Lübbecke in under 45 minutes. From the south you need about 20 minutes for the short but steep climb.

Gallery

External links

Minden-Lübbecke
Mountains and hills of North Rhine-Westphalia
Lübbecke